The 1977 America's Cup was held in September 1977 at Newport, Rhode Island. The US defender, Courageous, skippered by Ted Turner, defeated the Australian challenger, Australia, skippered by Noel Robins, in a four-race sweep. Courageous' greatest winning margin out of all four races was 2 minutes and 23 seconds. It was the second unsuccessful challenge by Alan Bond.

Courageous had beaten Lowell North's Enterprise and Ted Hood's Independence to become the defender. Australia had beaten France, Gretel II and Sverige to become the challenger.

This was Ted Turner's second try at a Cup, losing out at the defender trials at the 1974 Cup. His crew included tactician Gary Jobson. Enterprise had included Malin Burnham, Halsey Herreshoff and John Marshall.

Results

References

 
1977
America's Cup
America's Cup
America's Cup
September 1977 sports events in the United States